A referendum on the National Charter was held in Niger on 16 June 1987. In the first national vote since the military coup in 1974, voters were asked whether they approved of the Charter, which would establish non-elective, consultative institutions at both national and local levels. It was approved by 99.58% of voters with a 96.8% turnout.

Results

References

1987 referendums
1987 in Niger
1983